The Beets were an indie rock/punk rock group from Queens, New York, signed to the Hardly Art label. The band was led by Uruguayan-born Juan Wauters and also included bassist Jose Garcia,  and drummer/vocalist Jacob Warstler. Other incarnations included bassist Tall Juan Zaballa drummer/vocalist Melissa Scaduto, and drummer/vocalist Chie Mori. Matthew Volz worked as the band's official artist, providing hand-painted banners and unique light shows.  

The Beets have opened for Pavement, Vivian Girls, and the Mountain Goats.

Discography

Albums
Spit On the Face Of People Who Don't Want to Be Cool - (self-release, 2009)
Let the Poison Out - (Hardly Art, 2010)
Stay Home - (Captured Tracks, 2011)

Singles and EPs
"Don't Fit In My Head/"It's Okay to Lose" (Captured Tracks, 2009)
The Beets/Cassie Ramone - (Split release EP with Cassie Ramone, Psychic Lunch, 2010)
"Pick Another Corner"/"Time Brought Age" - (Captured Tracks, 2011)
"Silver Nickels and Golden Dimes"/"Psychedelic Bee" (Hardly Art, 2013)

References

Musical groups from Queens, New York
Punk rock groups from New York (state)
Hardly Art artists